Palacio Chiarino is a French Neoclassical building located on the corner of Plaza de Cagancha and Avenue 18 de Julio in the center of Montevideo, Uruguay. Its construction began in 1922 and finished in 1928. The architects Antonio Chiarino, Bartolome Triay and  Gaetano Moretti was commissioned to create the design for the Arturo Soneira family. Moretti died before the building was completed. Moretti also designed Palcio Legislativo in Montevideo, Uruguay.

Palacio Chiarino was added to the National Register of Historic Places and was declared a National Historic Landmark in 2011.

In popular culture
The building has been used for international movie productions. Including:

In the film Un paradiso per due (Life in Paradise), Palacio Chiarino is used as the mansion in Rome, Italy of Charles Bramati, a wealthy industrialist where several of the characters live.

References

 Guia Centro Montevideo 1996 by Julio C. Gaeta and Eduardo Folle
 La revista de El Pais: Paula Magazine April 2005 Edition, Oasis Urbano Page 42
 El Pais, "City eyes to haven", 29 April 2012
 Libro del Centenario (Centennial Book) that was published in 1925.
In the page 717 you'll see an article and drawn images  of the project for the Palacio Chiarino. Here is the link to the digital version of the book http://www.1811-2011.edu.uy/B1/content/libro-del-centenario-del-uruguay-1825-1925-tomo-vii-p%C3%A1ginas-675-856.

Centro, Montevideo
Palaces in Montevideo